Kumora is a rural locality (a settlement) in Severo-Baykalsky District, Republic of Buryatia, Russia. The population was 565 as of 2010. There are 21 streets.

Geography 
Kumora is located 230 km east of Nizhneangarsk (the district's administrative centre) by road. Novy Uoyan is the nearest rural locality.

References 

Rural localities in Severo-Baykalsky District